Anacithara rissoina is a species of sea snail, a marine gastropod mollusk in the family Horaiclavidae.

Description
The length of the shell attains , its diameter .

(Original description) The rather solid shell is elongate, rounded at the base and blunt at the apex. Its colour is dull white, with faint orange spots on the back of the body whorl. It contains six whorls, rounded and constricted at the sutures. The ribs are rounded and placed their breadth apart, alternate from whorl to whorl, undulate the suture, extend to the base, and number twelve on the penultimate whorl. The spirals are fine threads of uniform size and spacing, crossing both ribs and interstices, extending over the whole whorl except the fasciole area, numbering eight on the penultimate whorl and twenty on the body whorl. The wide aperture is unarmed. The varix is broad and high. The sinus is wide and shallow. The siphonal canal is a mere notch.

Distribution
This marine species is endemic to Australia and occurs off Queensland.

References

External links
  Tucker, J.K. 2004 Catalog of recent and fossil turrids (Mollusca: Gastropoda). Zootaxa 682:1–1295.

rissoina
Gastropods of Australia
Gastropods described in 1922